Maris Mägi (born 11 August 1987 in Tartu) is an Estonian sprinter who specializes in the 400 metres.

Maris Mägi's parents are track and field athletes Taivo Mägi and Anne Mägi. Her younger brother is hurdler Rasmus Mägi.

Achievements

Personal
Her brother Rasmus is also an athlete.

References

1987 births
Living people
Sportspeople from Tartu
Estonian female sprinters
Estonian female hurdlers
Competitors at the 2007 Summer Universiade
Competitors at the 2011 Summer Universiade
Competitors at the 2015 Summer Universiade
Miina Härma Gymnasium alumni
World Athletics Championships athletes for Estonia